Phillippi Dwain Sparks (born April 15, 1969) is a former American football cornerback in the National Football League.

Sparks graduated from Maryvale High School in Phoenix, Arizona, in 1987. He attended and played football for
Glendale Community College in Glendale, Arizona, from 1987 through 1989. Sparks played a key role on Glendale Community College's 1988 National Junior College Athletic Association national championship football team.

He then attended Arizona State University, where he was a member of the Sigma Chi fraternity. He was drafted by the New York Giants as the 13th pick in the second round of the 1992 NFL Draft. He played left cornerback opposite Jason Sehorn for six years and formed a talented defensive backfield tandem. He played for the Giants until 1999. In 2000, he was signed by the Dallas Cowboys. Sparks announced his retirement on August 28, 2001, having played for nine seasons.

He now resides in San Diego. Sparks has a son and a daughter. His daughter, Jordin, is a Grammy nominated singer who won the sixth season of American Idol in 2007.

References

External links
 ESPN Phillippi Sparks player page
 SI.com Player page

Sportspeople from Glendale, Arizona
Players of American football from Phoenix, Arizona
Sportspeople from Oklahoma City
American evangelicals
African-American players of American football
American football cornerbacks
Arizona State Sun Devils football players
Dallas Cowboys players
New York Giants players
1969 births
Living people
African-American Christians
Glendale Gauchos football players
21st-century African-American people
20th-century African-American sportspeople